The Dean of Killala is based at the Cathedral Church of St Patrick, Killala in the Diocese of Killala within the united bishopric of Tuam, Killala and Achonry of the Church of Ireland. The Cathedral Church of St Crumnathy, Achonry, was closed in 1997. The Chapters of Killala & Achonry were amalgamated in 2013; The Cathedral of St Patrick, Killala, becoming also the diocesan Cathedral of Achonry. The Dean of Killala is the Very Revd Alistair Grimason, also Dean of Tuam.

List of deans of Killala
1613: William Flanagan 
1628/9–1635: William Buchanan (afterwards Dean of Achonry, 1635) 
1635: Robert Forgie 
1664: Henry Dodwell 
1674: Alexander Murray 
1701–1718: Francis Knapp 
1718–1724: Jonathan Smedley (afterwards Dean of Clogher, 1724) 
1724–?1741: Peter Maturin  (died 1741)
1741–1770: Theophilus Brocas 
1770–1795: John Brocas 
1795: Thomas Vesey Dawson 
1796–1799: Thomas Thompson 
1800–1805: Walter Blake Kirwan
1806–1817: Edmund Burton 
1817–1844: Hon George Saunders Gore 
1844–1871: James Collins
1871–1885: William Jackson
1885–1903: William Skipton
1903–?1904: William Oliver Jackson (died 1904)
1904–?1911: C. Ormsby Wiley
1911–?1915: George Henry Croly
1915–1927: Theophilus Patrick Landey
1928–>: William Colvin
>1963–? Herbert Friedrich Friess (died 1997)
?–?1975 John Ernest Leeman (died 1975)
1976–1979: John Henry Hodgins
1979–1989: Malcolm Frederick Graham
1989–2003: Edward George Ardis
2003–2007: Sue Patterson
2007–2012: vacant
2012–2013: Wendy Mary Callan
2013–present: Alistair Grimason

References

 
Diocese of Tuam, Killala and Achonry
Killala